James Braidy Steinberg (born May 7, 1953) is an American academic and political advisor, and former United States Deputy Secretary of State. He has served as the dean of the Paul H. Nitze School of Advanced International Studies (SAIS) at Johns Hopkins University since November 1, 2021. Prior to his deanship, he was a professor at the Maxwell School of Citizenship and Public Affairs at Syracuse University

Biography

Early career
Steinberg was born to a Jewish family in Boston, Massachusetts. He was educated at Phillips Academy (1970), Harvard College (1973), and Yale Law School (1978). His previous positions included a senior fellowship for US Strategic Policy at the International Institute for Strategic Studies in London, UK (1985–1987), and senior analyst at RAND Corporation (1989–1993). Steinberg also served as a Senior Advisor to the Markle Foundation (2000–2001) and was a member of the Markle Task Force on National Security in the Information Age.

Early campaign work
During the national elections which brought U.S. President Jimmy Carter into office, Steinberg worked on the presidential campaign of the Carter-Mondale ticket. He also worked as a foreign policy advisor for Michael Dukakis' 1988 campaign.

Clinton administration
Steinberg served as U.S. State Department Director of Policy Planning (1994–1996), then Deputy National Security Advisor (December 1996 – 2001) to US President Bill Clinton. He also served on the Project on National Security Reform's Guiding Coalition.

Brookings Institution director and Lyndon B. Johnson School dean
After serving in the Clinton administration, Steinberg was a senior fellow at the Brookings Institution in Washington, D.C., and the Institution's vice president and director of Foreign Policy Studies (2001–2005). Steinberg was then Dean of the Lyndon B. Johnson School of Public Affairs at the University of Texas at Austin (2006–2009) until his appointment as U.S. Deputy Secretary of State on January 28, 2009, taking a leave of absence from the School for the duration of his term in office.

Obama administration

According to The Wall Street Journal, Steinberg, along with Daniel C. Kurtzer and Dennis Ross, were among the principal authors of Barack Obama’s address on the Middle East to AIPAC in June 2008, which was viewed as the Democratic Party nominee’s most expansive on international affairs.

He was mentioned as being "at the top" of Obama's list of candidates for the post of National Security Advisor, but Andrea Mitchell reported on November 24, 2008, that Hillary Clinton would appoint Steinberg United States Deputy Secretary of State. On December 23, 2008, Steinberg himself confirmed the appointment in a letter addressed to students and faculty at the Johnson school.

As Deputy Secretary of State and principal Deputy to US Secretary of State Hillary Clinton, Steinberg notably coined the phrase "strategic reassurance" to describe China–United States relations suggestive of the idea that the United States should reassure China about welcoming China's rise while China would reassure the US and its neighbors that it would not conflict with their interests.

Israel–U.S. strategic dialogue
In October 2010, Steinberg met with Israel’s Deputy Foreign Minister, Danny Ayalon, in Washington, D.C., where they discussed how to improve regional security and stability through boosting and growing the already strong cooperation between their two nations. During the talks, both delegates expressed their commitment to a lasting peace between Israel and its neighbors and their grave concern regarding Iran’s continued non-compliance with its international obligations through pursuit of a military nuclear program.

The following spring, they met in Jerusalem where they again took advantage of the opportunity to work together to identify and strategize against the threats both countries face including the rapidly changing political situation in the Middle East and the ongoing Iranian nuclear program.

Maxwell School deanship
In March 2011, Steinberg was named Dean of the Maxwell School of Citizenship and Public Affairs at Syracuse University. On July 28, 2011, he resigned as Deputy Secretary of State and assumed his new position. His term as dean ended in 2016.

CFR and Albright Stonebridge Group
Steinberg is a member of the Council on Foreign Relations. He also serves as Senior Counselor at Albright Stonebridge Group.

Personal life
He is married to Sherburne B. Abbott, vice president for sustainability initiatives and University Professor of Sustainability Science and Policy at Syracuse University. They have two daughters: Jenna and Emma.

Bibliography

References

External links
 James Steinberg   at The American Assembly's Next Generation Project
James B. Steinberg at US State Department
Research and commentary at the Brookings Institution

James Steinberg collected news and commentary at Fox News

Preventive war, a useful tool (by James Steinberg/Ivo Daalder). December 4, 2005
Policy Challenges and Opportunities for the United States in Asia  (Keynote address from 2010 Asia Policy Assembly, June 17, 2010)

|-

|-

1953 births
American diplomats
American foreign policy writers
American male non-fiction writers
Clinton administration personnel
Directors of Policy Planning
Living people
Harvard College alumni
Jewish American government officials
Obama administration personnel
Phillips Academy alumni
Johns Hopkins University faculty
Syracuse University faculty
United States Deputy Secretaries of State
University of Texas at Austin faculty
Yale Law School alumni
United States Deputy National Security Advisors
People from Boston